Andrea Saraniti (born 23 July 1988) is an Italian footballer who plays as a striker for Serie D club Casarano.

Club career
On 30 August 2019, Saraniti joined Vicenza on loan. On 13 August 2020, he joined Palermo.

On 2 August 2022, Saraniti signed with Casarano in Serie D.

Career statistics

References

1988 births
Footballers from Palermo
Living people
Italian footballers
Association football forwards
A.C.R. Messina players
U.S. Viterbese 1908 players
U.S. Vibonese Calcio players
Virtus Francavilla Calcio players
U.S. Lecce players
A.C. Sangiustese players
L.R. Vicenza players
Palermo F.C. players
Taranto F.C. 1927 players
Serie B players
Serie C players
Serie D players